Yuan Yelong (born 18 March 1997) is a Chinese footballer who currently plays for LigaPro side Cova da Piedade.

Club career
Yuan Yelong joined Coimbra FA Division of Honour side Tourizense in 2017. He made his senior debut on 14 January 2018, playing the whole match in a 0–0 home draw against Académica de Coimbra. Yuan transferred to LigaPro side Cova da Piedade on 20 July 2018. On 21 July 2018, he made his debut for the club in a 2–0 away defeat against Varzim in the first round of 2018–19 Taça da Liga. On 12 August 2018, he made his LigaPro debut in a 1–0 away win over Vitória Guimarães B.

Career statistics

References

1997 births
Living people
Chinese footballers
Footballers from Dalian
G.D. Tourizense players
C.D. Cova da Piedade players
Liga Portugal 2 players
Chinese expatriate footballers
Expatriate footballers in Portugal
Chinese expatriate sportspeople in Portugal
Association football defenders